The Class 151 is an electric heavy freight locomotive built for German Federal Railways between 1972 and 1978. They were built as a replacement for the ageing Class 150, in order to cope with the increased requirements of this type of locomotive, in particular the desire of a  top speed.

Locomotives of Hector Rail are designated as Class 162.

Technical specifications

History
On 21 November 1972 the first locomotive, 151 001, was delivered by AEG and Krupp. It was followed by 11 further pilot locomotives, which were extensively tested before the main order was built. Altogether 170 locomotives were built. Originally the Class 151 locomotives were also suitable for passenger service, however it is not possible anymore due to the lack of required safety equipment.

Deutsche Bahn's Class 151 fleet was sold to leasing company Railpool in 2017.

Saar-Rail bought three Class 151 locomotives in 2018. Two of them operate on freight services with torpedo cars, while one locomotive serves as a spare parts donor.

, 34 locomotives are in service with private railway companies. DB Cargo has leased 19 locomotives.

References

External links

Electric locomotives of Germany
15 kV AC locomotives
151
Co′Co′ locomotives
AEG locomotives
Brown, Boveri & Cie locomotives
Siemens locomotives
Henschel locomotives
Krauss-Maffei locomotives
Krupp locomotives
Railway locomotives introduced in 1972
Standard gauge locomotives of Germany
Freight locomotives
Co′Co′ electric locomotives of Europe